Jordan Allan (born 20 October 1998) is a Scottish footballer who plays for Falkirk. He has previously played for Airdrieonians, Wolverhampton Wanderers, Cowdenbeath, Forfar Athletic and Clyde.

Career

In April 2013, Allan made his debut for Scottish club Airdrie United as a substitute against Livingston in a 2–0 defeat. Still a pupil at Calderside Academy and aged just 14 years and 189 days, Allan became the youngest player to represent a first team in the Scottish Football League, and Britain, breaking the record previously established by Reuben Noble-Lazarus in January 2008; (the British record stood for almost a decade before being broken by Christopher Atherton from Northern Ireland) but the SFL record will never be bettered as the organisation was replaced by the Scottish Professional Football League a few months later.

In May 2014, Allan signed for Wolverhampton Wanderers. On 30 August 2017 he returned to his former club Airdrieonians on a six-month loan deal. Allan was released by Wolves at the end of the 2017–18 season.

He signed for Scottish League Two club Cowdenbeath in November 2018, and then moved to Forfar Athletic during August 2020. Allan returned to Airdrie in June 2021.

Allan would join Scottish League One club Clyde in the summer of 2022, and would have a very successful 6 months with the Bully Wee in which he scored ten league goals by the midway point and would win the League One player of the month for November 2022.

On 26 January 2023, Allan would move to league rivals Falkirk for an undisclosed fee and would sign a two-and-a-half-year deal with the Bairns.

References

1998 births
People educated at Calderside Academy
Scottish footballers
Airdrieonians F.C. players
Scottish Football League players
Association football forwards
Living people
Wolverhampton Wanderers F.C. players
Scotland youth international footballers
Cowdenbeath F.C. players
Scottish Professional Football League players
Forfar Athletic F.C. players
Clyde F.C. players
Footballers from Hamilton, South Lanarkshire

Falkirk F.C. players